

1940s

LGBT
1940s in LGBT history
1940s
1940s
LGBT